Union Sunday School, or variants thereof, can refer to:

Union Sunday School (Clermont, Iowa), listed on the National Register of Historic Places in Iowa
Sanatoga Union Sunday School, listed on the National Register of Historic Places in Pennsylvania